Murasame-class destroyer may refer to:

  (1958–1988), a class of destroyers in the Japan Maritime Self-Defense Force
 , a third-generation warship class in service with the Japan Maritime Self-Defense Force

See also
 Murasame (disambiguation)